Religion in Belgium is diversified, with Christianity, in particular, the Catholic Church, representing the largest community, though it has experienced a significant decline since the 1960s (when it was the nominal religion of over 80% of the population). Belgium's policy separates the state from the churches, and freedom of religion of the citizens is guaranteed by the country's constitution.

According to the Eurobarometer poll carried out by the European Commission in December 2018, the share of Christians increased by 10% points from 52.5% in 2009 to 62.8% in 9 years, with Catholicism being the largest denomination at 57.1%. Protestants comprised 2.3% and Orthodox Christians comprised 0.6%. Non-religious people comprised 29.3% of the population and were divided between those who primarily identified as atheists (9.1%) or as agnostics (20.2%). A further 6.8% of the population was Muslim and 1.1% were believers in other religions. The following Eurobarometer's survey done in May and published in September 2019 showed Christians decreased from 62.8% in 2018 to around 60% in 2019, with Catholics at 54%, Protestants at 3%, Orthodox Christians at 1%, other Christians at 2%, Shia Muslims at 2%, Sunni Muslims at 2%, other Muslims at 1%, irreligious at 31% and other religions at 4%.

Beliefs and practices 
According to a 2010 Eurobarometer poll:

 37% of Belgian citizens believe there is a god.
 31% believe there is some sort of spirit or life force.
 27% do not believe there is any sort of spirit, God, or life force.
 5% declined to answer.

Some religious people dispute these precise figures, as it is difficult to determine the number of Belgian Christians that believe in a personal deity. What is also unclear is the number of registered Belgian Catholics with deistic beliefs or who periodically attend small Evangelical churches.

Chronological statistics

Government and religion

The Belgian constitution provides for freedom of religion, and the government generally respects this right in practice. However, government officials have the authority to research and monitor religious groups that are not officially recognised. There are a few reports of societal abuses or discrimination based on religious belief or practice, and some reports of discrimination against minority religious groups.

Belgian law officially recognizes many religions, including Catholicism, Protestantism, Anglicanism, Islam, Judaism, and Eastern Orthodoxy, as well as non-religious philosophical organizations (Dutch: vrijzinnige levensbeschouwelijke organisaties; French: organizations laïques). Buddhism is in the process of being recognized under the secular organization standard. Official recognition means that priests (called "counselors" within the secular organizations) receive a state stipend. Also, parents can choose any recognized denomination to provide religious education to their children if they attend a state school. Adherents to religions that are not officially recognized are not denied the right to practice their religion but do not receive state stipends.

After attaining autonomy from the federal government in religious matters, the Flemish Parliament passed a regional decree installing democratically elected church councils for all recognised religious denominations and making them subject to the same administrative rules as local government bodies, with important repercussions for financial accounting and open government. In 2006, however, Catholic bishops still appointed candidates to the Catholic Church councils because they had not decided on the criteria for eligibility; they were afraid that candidates might be merely baptized Catholics. By 2008, however, the bishops decided that candidates for the church councils had only to prove that they were over 18, a member of the parish church serving the town or village in which they lived, and baptized Catholic.

Religions

Christianity

Catholic Church 

Catholicism has traditionally been Belgium's majority religion, with particular strength in Flanders. However, by 2009, Sunday church attendance was 5.4% in Flanders, down from 12.7% in 1998. Nationwide, Sunday church attendance was 5% in 2009, down from 11.2% in 1998. As of 2015, 52.9% Belgian population claimed to belong to the Catholic Church. According to Ipsos, only 41% of the working-age, internet connected people declared to be Catholics.

Until 1998, the Catholic Church annually published key figures such as Sunday mass attendance and the number of baptized children. In 2006, it announced that mass attendance for the Christmas period was 11.5%, and weekly mass attendance (not only on Sundays) was 7%, for the Flanders region. Since 2000, Sunday church attendance in Flanders has dropped by an average of 0.5%–1% each year. In the years 2010 to 2016, 12,442 people in Flanders formally left the Catholic Church.

Protestantism 

In 1566, at the peak of Belgian Reformation, there were an estimated 300,000 Protestants, or 20% of the Belgian population. The Spanish reconquest of the Southern Netherlands in the Eighty Years' War prompted most of the Belgian Protestants to flee to the north or convert, causing the region to again be overwhelmingly Catholic. As of 2016, Protestantism represented 2.1% of the total population and 2% of the working-age, internet connected population. The Pew Research Center, an American think tank, proposes an even lower estimate at 1.4% of the total population.

The Administrative Council of Protestant and Evangelical Religion in Belgium is a coordinating group that mediates between many Protestant groups and the government. The largest Protestant denomination is the United Protestant Church in Belgium, with some 138 affiliated churches.

Belgium had thirteen Anglican churches as of 2012, including the pro-cathedral, Holy Trinity, Brussels. They are part of the Church of England's Diocese in Europe, and of the Convocation of Episcopal Churches in Europe.

Orthodox Christianity 
Eastern Orthodox Christians made up 1.6% of the total Belgian population in 2015. The region with the greatest proportion of Eastern Orthodox Christians was the Bruxelles-Capital Region, in which they formed 8.3% of the population. Ipsos' survey in 2016 found that Orthodox Christianity was the religion of about 1% of the working-age, internet connected Belgians.

Eastern Orthodoxy 

The Eastern Orthodox Church in Belgium is subdivided into several canonical jurisdictions:
 Diocese of Brussels and Belgium, of the Russian Orthodox Church;
 Metropolis of Belgium, of the Ecumenical Patriarchate of Constantinople;
 Serbian Orthodox Eparchy of Western Europe;
 Romanian Orthodox Archdiocese of Western Europe;
 Eparchy of Central and Western Europe, of the Bulgarian Orthodox Church.

Oriental Orthodoxy 
There are significant Armenian communities that reside in Belgium, many of them are descendants of traders who settled during the 19th century. Most Armenian Belgians are adherents of the Armenian Apostolic Church, with smaller numbers belonging to the Armenian Catholic Church or the Armenian Evangelical Church. These churches have not yet received official recognition.

Islam 

In 2015, according to the Eurobarometer survey made by the European Commission, 5.2% of the total Belgian population was Muslim. In a 2016 study, Ipsos found that 3% of the working-age, internet connected Belgian population declaring to be believers in Islam.

As of 2015, it was estimated that 7% of the Belgians (781,887) were Muslims, including 329,749 in Flanders (forming 5.1% of the region's population), 174,136 in Wallonia (4.9%), and 277,867 in Brussels (23.6%).

Buddhism

Eurobarometer 2015 found only 0.2% of the total Belgian population declaring to be Buddhist. Despite that, one year later Ipsos found that 2% of the working-age, internet connected Belgians were Buddhists.

Confucianism
According to Ipsos, 1% of the working-age, internet-connected Belgians declared that they believed in Confucianism. This segment of the population may include many – if not all – the Chinese communities in Belgium.

Hinduism
Hinduism forms a negligible, but fast growing minority in Belgium. In 2006, there were about 6500 Hindus in the country. this increased to 7901 Hindus in 2015 and 10,000 in 2020. The majority of Hindus in Belgium originate from Nepal, some come from diamond trading communities in India, and some are native converts, mostly of the ISKON movement.

Antoinism
Antoinism is a Christian-inspired new religious movement which was created by Louis-Joseph Antoine (1846–1912). It remains the only significant such movement to originate in Belgium and has adherents in France and elsewhere.

History

6th–7th century: Christianisation
After the Roman period, Christianity was brought back to the southern Low Countries by missionary saints like Willibrord and Amandus. In the 7th century, abbeys were founded in remote places, and it was mainly from these abbeys that the Christianization process was started. This process was expanded under the auspices of the Merovingian dynasty, and later by Charlemagne, who even waged war to impose the new religion.

17th–18th century: Catholicism as the state religion
From the Spanish military conquest of 1592 until the re-establishment of religious freedom in 1781 by the Patent of Toleration under Joseph II of Austria, Catholicism was the only religion allowed, on penalty of death, in the territories now forming Belgium. However, a small number of Protestant groups managed to survive at Maria-Horebeke, Dour, Tournai, Eupen, and Hodimont.

19th–20th century
Religion was one of the differences between the almost solidly Catholic south and the predominantly Protestant north of the United Kingdom of the Netherlands, formed in 1815. The union broke up in 1830 when the south seceded to form the Kingdom of Belgium. In Belgium's first century, Catholicism was such a binding factor socially that it prevailed over the language divide (Dutch versus French). The decline in religion's importance as a social marker across late-20th-century Western Europe explains to a large extent the current centrifugal forces in Belgium, with language differences (increasingly reinforced by a positive feedback effect in the media) no longer being kept in check by a religious binding factor. If anything, the Catholic Church has acquiesced to these changes by having a Dutch-speaking university (Katholieke Universiteit Leuven) and a French-speaking university (Universite Catholique de Louvain).

Until the late 20th century, Catholicism played an important role in Belgian politics. One significant example was the so-called Schools' Wars (Dutch: schoolstrijd; French: guerres scolaires) between the country's philosophically left-wing parties (liberals at first, joined by Socialists later) and the Catholic party (later the Christian Democrats), which took place from 1879 to 1884 and from 1954 to 1958. Another important controversy happened in 1990, when the Catholic monarch, King Baudouin I, refused to ratify an abortion bill that had been approved by Parliament. The king asked Prime Minister Wilfried Martens and his government to find a solution, which proved novel. The government declared King Baudouin unfit to fulfill his constitutional duties as monarch for one day. Government ministers signed the bill in his place and then proceeded to reinstate the king after the abortion law had come into effect.

21st century

In 2002, the officially recognized Protestant denomination at the time, the United Protestant Church of Belgium (consisting of around 100 member churches, usually with a Calvinist or Methodist past) and the unsubsidized Federal Synod of Protestant and Evangelical Churches (which had 600 member churches in 2008 but did not include all Evangelical and Charismatic groups outside the Catholic tradition) together formed the Administrative Council of the Protestant and Evangelical Religion (ARPEE in Dutch, CACPE in French). The council is now the accepted mouthpiece of Protestantism in all three linguistic communities of Belgium: Dutch, French, and German.

The 21st century has witnessed significant changes in the religious demography of Belgium, characterized by a decline of Catholicism and the growth of irreligion and other religions, some of them brought by waves of immigration from foreign countries, including Pentecostalism, Orthodox Christianity, Islam, Hinduism, Buddhism and Chinese religions. Apart from Islam, however, these groups are very small demographically, especially alongside the unaffiliated demographic of 37%.

See also
 Basilica of the Sacred Heart in Koekelberg
 Buddhism in Belgium
 Hinduism in Belgium
 History of Dutch religion
 History of the Jews in Belgium
 Holy Corner, a small ecumenical neighbourhood of Ghent with four officially recognised churches
 Islam in Belgium
 Irreligion in Belgium
 Jainism in Belgium
 Catholic Church in Belgium
 Scientology in Belgium
 Sikhism in Belgium
 Conference of Protestant Churches in Latin Countries of Europe

References

External links

Official website of Buddhism in Belgium
Official website of Catholicism in Flanders
Official website of Catholicism in Wallonia
Official website of Islam in Belgium
Official website of Judaism in Belgium
Official website of the Orthodox Church in Belgium
Official website of Protestantism and Evangelicalism in Belgium